In physics, the electric displacement field (denoted by D) or electric induction is a vector field that appears in Maxwell's equations.  It accounts for the effects of free and bound charge within materials. "D" stands for "displacement", as in the related concept of displacement current in dielectrics. In free space, the electric displacement field is equivalent to flux density, a concept that lends understanding of Gauss's law. In the International System of Units (SI), it is expressed in units of coulomb per meter square (C⋅m−2).

Definition 

In a dielectric material, the presence of an electric field E causes the bound charges in the material (atomic nuclei and their electrons) to slightly separate, inducing a local electric dipole moment. The electric displacement field "D" is defined as

where  is the vacuum permittivity (also called permittivity of free space), and P is the (macroscopic) density of the permanent and induced electric dipole moments in the material, called the polarization density.

The displacement field satisfies Gauss's law in a dielectric:
 

In this equation,  is the number of free charges per unit volume. These charges are the ones that have made the volume non-neutral, and they are sometimes referred to as the space charge. This equation says, in effect, that the flux lines of D must begin and end on the free charges. In contrast  is the density of all those charges that are part of a dipole, each of which is neutral. In the example of an insulating dielectric between metal capacitor plates, the only free charges are on the metal plates and dielectric contains only dipoles.

Electrostatic forces on ions or electrons in the material are governed by the electric field E in the material via the Lorentz Force. Also, D is not determined exclusively by the free charge.  As E has a curl of zero in electrostatic situations, it follows that

The effect of this equation can be seen in the case of an object with a "frozen in" polarization like a bar electret, the electric analogue to a bar magnet.  There is no free charge in such a material, but the inherent polarization gives rise to an electric field, demonstrating that the D field is not determined entirely by the free charge.  The electric field is determined by using the above relation along with other boundary conditions on the polarization density to yield the bound charges, which will, in turn, yield the electric field.

In a linear, homogeneous, isotropic dielectric with instantaneous response to changes in the electric field, P depends linearly on the electric field,

where the constant of proportionality  is called the electric susceptibility of the material. Thus

where ε = ε0 εr is the permittivity, and εr = 1 + χ the relative permittivity of the material.

In linear, homogeneous, isotropic media, ε is a constant. However, in linear anisotropic media it is a tensor, and in nonhomogeneous media it is a function of position inside the medium. It may also depend upon the electric field (nonlinear materials) and have a time dependent response. Explicit time dependence can arise if the materials are physically moving or changing in time (e.g. reflections off a moving interface give rise to Doppler shifts).  A different form of time dependence can arise in a time-invariant medium, as there can be a time delay between the imposition of the electric field and the resulting polarization of the material.  In this case, P is a convolution of the impulse response susceptibility χ and the electric field E.  Such a convolution takes on a simpler form in the frequency domain: by Fourier transforming the relationship and applying the convolution theorem, one obtains the following relation for a linear time-invariant medium:

where  is the frequency of the applied field. The constraint of causality leads to the Kramers–Kronig relations, which place limitations upon the form of the frequency dependence. The phenomenon of a frequency-dependent permittivity is an example of material dispersion.  In fact, all physical materials have some material dispersion because they cannot respond instantaneously to applied fields, but for many problems (those concerned with a narrow enough bandwidth) the frequency-dependence of ε can be neglected.

At a boundary, where σf is the free charge density and the unit normal  points in the direction from medium 2 to medium 1.

History 
Gauss's law was formulated by Carl Friedrich Gauss in 1835, but was not published until 1867, meaning that the formulation and use of D were not earlier than 1835, and probably not earlier than the 1860s.

The earliest known use of the term is from the year 1864, in James Clerk Maxwell's paper A Dynamical Theory of the Electromagnetic Field. Maxwell used calculus to exhibit Michael Faraday's theory, that light is an electromagnetic phenomenon. Maxwell introduced the term D, specific capacity of electric induction, in a form different from the modern and familiar notations.

It was Oliver Heaviside who reformulated the complicated Maxwell's equations to the modern form. It wasn't until 1884 that Heaviside, concurrently with Willard Gibbs and Heinrich Hertz, grouped the equations together into a distinct set. This group of four equations was known variously as the Hertz–Heaviside equations and the Maxwell–Hertz equations, and is sometimes still known as the Maxwell–Heaviside equations; hence, it was probably Heaviside who lent D the present significance it now has.

Example: Displacement field in a capacitor 

Consider an infinite parallel plate capacitor where the space between the plates is empty or contains a neutral, insulating medium. In this case there are no free charges present except on the metal capacitor plates. Since the flux lines D end on free charges, and there are the same number of uniformly distributed charges of opposite sign on both plates, then the flux lines must all simply traverse the capacitor from one side to the other, and  outside the capacitor.  In SI units, the charge density on the plates is equal to the value of the D field between the plates.  This follows directly from Gauss's law, by integrating over a small rectangular box straddling one plate of the capacitor:

On the sides of the box, dA is perpendicular to the field, so the integral over this section is zero, as is the integral on the face that is outside the capacitor where D is zero. The only surface that contributes to the integral is therefore the surface of the box inside the capacitor, and hence

If the space between the capacitor plates is filled with a linear homogeneous isotropic dielectric with permittivity , then there is a polarization induced in the medium,  and so the voltage difference between the plates is

where d is their separation.

Introducing the dielectric increases ε by a factor  and either the voltage difference between the plates will be smaller by this factor, or the charge must be higher. The partial cancellation of fields in the dielectric allows a larger amount of free charge to dwell on the two plates of the capacitor per unit of potential drop than would be possible if the plates were separated by vacuum.

If the distance d between the plates of a finite parallel plate capacitor is much smaller than its lateral dimensions
we can approximate it using the infinite case and obtain its capacitance as

See also 
 
 Polarization density
 Electric susceptibility
 Magnetizing field
 Electric dipole moment

References 

Electric and magnetic fields in matter